David Zayas (born August 15, 1962) is a Puerto Rican actor. He is best known for his roles as Angel Batista on Showtime's series Dexter and  Enrique Morales on the HBO prison drama series Oz.

Early life
Zayas was born in Ponce, Puerto Rico, and raised in The Bronx, New York.

Career
Zayas joined the United States Air Force at age 19 and was a police officer with the New York City Police Department for almost 15 years. His experience as a police officer allowed him to develop as a character actor, leading to a series of acting jobs on television and film, mainly playing law enforcement officers, but playing characters on the other side of the law, as well, such as Enrique Morales on HBO's long-running prison-drama Oz. Zayas was a main cast member of Dexter for all of its eight seasons.

Zayas has been a member of the LAByrinth Theater Company since 1992, a New York City-based traveling actors group. He branched out into television and film projects, and has diversified with guest roles in such popular television series such as New York Undercover, Person of Interest, FBI , NYPD Blue. At LAByrinth, he met his future wife, actress Liza Colón.

Zayas played a corrupt police officer in 16 Blocks (2006) and an NYPD officer in Michael Clayton (2007). He is featured in the independent film Shadowboxing (2010), which appeared on the film festival circuit. He appears in Sylvester Stallone's feature film The Expendables (2010) and The Brothers Strause's film Skyline (2010). In 2012, Zayas played Ernie Trask, a hotel super, in the twelfth episode of season 1 of Person of Interest.
In the 2013 he portrayed Detective Esteban Flores in Jodi Arias: Dirty Little Secret a television movie about the murder of Travis Alexander.

Zayas portrays mob boss Don Salvatore Maroni in the Batman prequel, Gotham, which premiered on Fox on September 22, 2014. Shortly thereafter, he appeared in Annie (2014) as Lou, a gregarious bodega owner who helps Cameron Diaz's Hannigan learn to love herself.

Filmography

Film

Television

References

External links

 

 

1962 births
Living people
Male actors from New York City
New York City Police Department officers
People from the Bronx
Male actors from Ponce, Puerto Rico
Puerto Rican male film actors
Puerto Rican male stage actors
Puerto Rican male television actors
Puerto Rican United States Air Force personnel
United States Air Force airmen
20th-century American male actors
21st-century American male actors